, also known as  in the Kojiki, and  in the Nihon Shoki was the ninth legendary emperor of Japan, according to the traditional order of succession. Very little is known about this Emperor due to a lack of material available for further verification and study. Kaika is known as a "legendary emperor" among historians as his actual existence is disputed. Nothing exists in the Kojiki other than his name and genealogy. Kaika's reign allegedly began in 158 BC. He had one wife and three consorts whom he fathered five children with. After his death in 98 BC, one of his sons supposedly became Emperor Sujin.

Legendary narrative
In the Kojiki and Nihon Shoki, only Kaika's name and genealogy were recorded. The Japanese have traditionally accepted this sovereign's historical existence, and an Imperial misasagi or tomb for Kaika is currently maintained; however, no extant contemporary records have been discovered that confirm a view that this historical figure actually reigned. Kaika was born sometime in 208 BC, and is recorded as being the second son of Emperor Kōgen. His empress mother was named Utsushikome, who was the daughter of Oyakuchisukune. Before he was enthroned sometime in 158 BC, his pre-ascension name was Prince Nikohiko Ō-hibi no Mikoto. Emperor Kaika had a chief wife (empress) named Ikagashikome, along with three consorts of which he fathered five children with. Kaika ruled until his death in 98 BC; his second son was then enthroned as the next emperor. His son/heir to the throne was posthumously named Sujin by later generations, and is the first emperor that historians say might have actually existed.

Known information

The existence of at least the first nine Emperors is disputed due to insufficient material available for further verification and study. Kaika is thus regarded by historians as a "legendary Emperor", and is considered to have been the eighth of eight Emperors without specific legends associated with them. The name Kaika-tennō was assigned to him posthumously by later generations.
 His name might have been regularized centuries after the lifetime ascribed to Kaika, possibly during the time in which legends about the origins of the Yamato dynasty were compiled as the chronicles known today as the Kojiki. While the actual site of Kaika's grave is not known, the Emperor is traditionally venerated at a memorial Shinto shrine (misasagi) in Nara. The Imperial Household Agency designates this location as Kaika's mausoleum, and its formal name is Kasuga no Izakawa no saka no e no misasagi.

Like Emperor Kōshō and Emperor Kōrei, there is a possibility that "Kaika" could have lived instead in the 1st century (AD). Historian Louis Frédéric notes this idea in his book Japan Encyclopedia where he says "more likely early AD", but this remains disputed among other researchers. The first emperor that historians state might have actually existed is Emperor Sujin, the 10th emperor of Japan. Outside of the Kojiki, the reign of Emperor Kinmei ( – 571 AD) is the first for which contemporary historiography is able to assign verifiable dates. The conventionally accepted names and dates of the early Emperors were not confirmed as "traditional" though, until the reign of Emperor Kanmu between 737 and 806 AD.

Consorts and children
Empress: , Oohesoki's daughter
, later Emperor Sujin

Consort: , Taniwa no Ooagatanushi Yugori's daughter

Consort: , Prince Waninishisaihito's daughter

Consort: , Katsuragi no Tarumi no Sukune's daughter

See also
 Emperor of Japan
 List of Emperors of Japan
 Imperial cult

Notes

References

Further reading
 Aston, William George. (1896).  Nihongi: Chronicles of Japan from the Earliest Times to A.D. 697. London: Kegan Paul, Trench, Trubner.  
 Brown, Delmer M. and Ichirō Ishida, eds. (1979).  Gukanshō: The Future and the Past. Berkeley: University of California Press. ;  
 Chamberlain, Basil Hall. (1920). The Kojiki. Read before the Asiatic Society of Japan on April 12, May 10, and June 21, 1882; reprinted, May, 1919.  
 Nussbaum, Louis-Frédéric and Käthe Roth. (2005).  Japan encyclopedia. Cambridge: Harvard University Press. ;  
 Ponsonby-Fane, Richard Arthur Brabazon. (1959).  The Imperial House of Japan. Kyoto: Ponsonby Memorial Society. 
 Titsingh, Isaac. (1834). Nihon Ōdai Ichiran; ou,  Annales des empereurs du Japon.  Paris: Royal Asiatic Society, Oriental Translation Fund of Great Britain and Ireland.  
 Varley, H. Paul. (1980).  Jinnō Shōtōki: A Chronicle of Gods and Sovereigns. New York: Columbia University Press. ;  

 
 

Legendary Emperors of Japan
2nd-century BC legendary rulers
1st-century BC legendary rulers
1st-century BC Japanese monarchs
People of Yayoi-period Japan